Mother's Bistro and Bar is a restaurant in Portland, Oregon.

Description and history
Lisa Schroeder is the owner and executive chef. She opened Mother's in 2000. Schroeder announced plans to relocate the business in mid 2018. Mother's relocated from 212 SW Harvey Milk Street (formerly 212 SW Stark Street) to 121 SW Third Avenue, inside the Multnomah Hotel, in January 2019.

Reception
Mother's tied for first place in the "best old hometown restaurant" category Willamette Week 2002 reader's poll. The restaurant ranked number one in the "Best Omelet" category, and Schroeder was named "Best Chef", in the same poll in 2016. Mother's also ranked third place in The Oregonian "best brunch" poll in 2016.

References

External links

 
 

2000 establishments in Oregon
Restaurants established in 2000
Restaurants in Portland, Oregon
Southwest Portland, Oregon